Hongliuyuan, also known as Liuyuan Town , is a District of Guazhou in Gansu province of China.

Hongliuyuan was the name of a post station in the area in ancient times. In 1958, Ministry of Railways of the People's Republic of China set up a railway station at this place, and changed the name to Liuyuan. In 1962, a town was founded and named as Liuyuan Town.

Transport 
China National Highway 215
China National Highway 312

Sources 

Township-level divisions of Gansu
Guazhou County